Clivina limbipennis is a species of ground beetle in the subfamily Scaritinae. It was described by Jacquelin du Val in 1857.

References

limbipennis
Beetles described in 1857